This is an incomplete list of corps and Aviation Divisions of the Russian Air Force and Russian Air Defence Force (PVO) active from 1992 to the present.

Index of abbreviations
дПВО (dPVO) - Air Defence Division (Diviziya Protivo-Vozdushnaya Oborona)
KPVO - Air Defence Corps (Korpus Protivo-Vozdushnaya Oborona)
OA PVO - Independent Army of the Air Defence Forces
SAD - Composite Aviation Division (Smeshannaya Aviatsionnaya Diviziya)
TBAD - Heavy Bomber Aviation Division (Tiazholaya Bombardirovochnaya Aviatsionnaya Diviziya)
VTAD - Military Transport Aviation Division (Voyenno-Transportnaya Aviatsionnaya Diviziya)

Notes

References
Piotr Butowski. Force report:Russian Air Force, Air Forces Monthly, July & August 2007 issues.
Feskov, V.I., et al. The Soviet Army in the Years of the Cold War: 1945-91, Tomsk University Publishing House, Tomsk, 2004

External links
http://ww2doc.50megs.com/Issue38/Issue38_085.html - some PVO divisions of the Soviet Red Army, July 1941 (Russian)

Units and formations of the Russian Air Force
Air